Fierce is a British R&B group.

Fierce may also refer to:

 Fierce!, an international performance festival in Birmingham, UK
 FIERCE, a non-profit working with LGBTQ youth of color in New York City
 Fierce (fragrance), a men's fragrance made by Abercrombie & Fitch
FierceBiotech, FierceHealthcare, etc., a series of trade magazines by Questex
Jaidynn Diore Fierce, American drag queen
Robin Fierce, American drag queen